The Five Hegemons refers to several especially powerful rulers of Chinese states of the Spring and Autumn period of Chinese history (770 to 476 BCE), sometimes alternatively referred to as the "Age of Hegemons". There are various lists of five  rulers of those certain states which rose to power over the other states of this time period, states which were also formed during the period of dissolution of a once real and strong central state, namely the empire of the Zhou dynasty. The Hegemons mobilized the remnants of the Zhou empire, according to shared mutual political and martial interests. An especially prominent Hegemon was Duke Huan of Qi.

Pronunciation and meaning
Both  and  can be translated as the 'Five Hegemons'.  literally means 'five', but in the context of ancient Chinese also has a more generally qualitative and less precisely quantitative use, implying completeness.

Use of the term
During the Spring and Autumn era itself, the hegemony tended to apply to states; it was therefore possible to speak of the State of Jin and the State of Chu struggling for hegemony over the Zhou states. In historical accounts it instead became associated with individual rulers, namely the ones who first brought their respective states to a dominant position. During the Spring and Autumn period the reigns of each hegemon tended to correspond with the zenith of their state's power.

Timeline of the most prominent hegemonsyears in BCE

The Hegemon System

The concept of hegemony arose out of the weakness of the Eastern Zhou dynasty. Whilst its predecessor, the Western Zhou dynasty, was also feudal in nature, the centre was strong enough to command the obedience of most of its vassals, as well as to maintain a central army. The death of King You of Zhou and the sack of the Zhou capital in 771 BC rendered the position of the central court untenable and eventually dependent on the protection of neighbouring states.

The concept of the Hegemon was important to the interstate relations during the Spring and Autumn period, since the Hegemon was nominally charged with underwriting the stability of the whole system, often heading a league of smaller states whose security was to some extent guaranteed by the state, in exchange for tribute.

The Five Hegemons
These are the two most commonly used lists of hegemons.

The Records of the Grand Historian lists:

 Duke Huan of Qi
 Duke Xiang of Song
 Duke Wen of Jin
 Duke Mu of Qin
 King Zhuang of Chu

Alternatively, the Xunzi lists:

 Duke Huan of Qi
 Duke Wen of Jin
 King Zhuang of Chu
 Helü, King of Wu
 Goujian, King of Yue

The first two hegemons are widely referred to in primary sources (e.g. Zuo Zhuan) and therefore rarely disputed because Duke Huan of Qi and Duke Wen of Jin themselves were officially rewarded the hegemony by the kings of Zhou (King Xi and King Xiang) in 679 BCE and in 632 BCE respectively.

Duke Zhuang of Zheng and Fuchai, King of Wu, were also amongst the contenders aside of the seven rulers mentioned above.

These lists are:

The Ci Tong lists:
 Duke Zhuang of Zheng
 Duke Huan of Qi
 Duke Wen of Jin
 Duke Mu of Qin
 King Zhuang of Chu

The  lists:
 Duke Huan of Qi
 Duke Wen of Jin
 Duke Mu of Qin
 King Zhuang of Chu
 Goujian, King of Yue

The Bai Hu Tong lists:
 Duke Huan of Qi
 Duke Wen of Jin
 Duke Mu of Qin
 King Zhuang of Chu
 Helü, King of Wu

The Book of Han lists:
 Duke Huan of Qi
 Duke Xiang of Song
 Duke Wen of Jin
 Duke Mu of Qin
 Fuchai, King of Wu

Notes

See also
Four Lords of the Warring States

Hegemony
Spring and Autumn period